The Boy From 5B is a 1972 Soviet comedy film directed by Ilya Frez.
It was edited into three parts, given a narrative voiceover and shown on BBC 1 television in the UK on consecutive mornings during the 1978 Easter and 1979 and 1980 summer holidays.

Plot 
The schoolboy Borya becomes a first-class counselor and is gradually imbued with an interest in work.

Cast 
 Andrei Voynovsky
 Roza Agisheva
 Tatyana Pelttser as Grandmother
 Nina Kornienko
 Natalya Bespalova
 Nikolay Merzlikin		
 Yelizaveta Auerbakh
 Yevgeniy Vesnik
 Yuliya Korneva
 Dmitry Sosnovsky

References

External links 
 

1972 films
1970s Russian-language films
Soviet comedy films
1972 comedy films